Kashitar is a populated place in Jiling, Nuwakot District, Nepal.Kashitar is one of the Ancient Place and Religious Place as per folks.Now Modern Kashitar had established with best place to enrich its business and economy by Tourism,Agriculture,Industries and Bank.

This are the Few Establishment here in Kashiar.

1.Devighat Cold Storage Pvt Ltd. 2.Npaisa Pvt Ltd. 
3.Nepal Khadhya Bank Ltd. 
4.Everest Bank (Mobile ATM ) 5.Cherry Garden Resorts Pvt Ltd.

Kashitar is getting better place for secured investment for Eco Friendly Industries,Companies etc.It is also best place for Agri Tourism,Eco Tourism initiated place.

References

Populated places in Nuwakot District